Charles Thomas Wright was a male athlete who competed for England.

Athletics career
He represented England in the 880 yards and 1 mile race at the 1950 British Empire Games in Auckland, New Zealand.

References

English male middle-distance runners
Athletes (track and field) at the 1950 British Empire Games
Commonwealth Games competitors for England